Philautus is a genus of shrub frogs in the family Rhacophoridae from Asia. Some species in this genus are now considered extinct by IUCN, while others are widespread and abundant (such as the recently described P. abundus, which was specifically named for this fact). The taxonomy of the group is unclear, with many poorly described species.

This genus is unique in that development not direct, with all growth inside the egg and no free-swimming tadpole stage. Some species have been found to bury their eggs in soil, although they are arboreal, and others attach their eggs to leaves.

Revision
In early 2009, Delhi University researchers revised this genus after discovering and rediscovering species in Western Ghats forest.

List of species
The following species are recognised in the genus Philautus:

 Philautus abditus Inger, Orlov, and Darevsky, 1999
 Philautus acutirostris (Peters, 1867)
 Philautus acutus Dring, 1987
 Philautus amabilis Wostl, Riyanto, Hamidy, Kurniawan, Smith, and Harvey, 2017
 Philautus amoenus Smith, 1931
 Philautus aurantium Inger, 1989
 Philautus aurifasciatus (Schlegel, 1837)
 Philautus bunitus Inger, Stuebing, and Tan, 1995
 Philautus cardamonus Ohler, Swan, and Daltry, 2002
 Philautus catbaensis Milto, Poyarkov, Orlov, and Nguyen, 2013
 Philautus cinerascens (Stoliczka, 1870)
 Philautus cornutus (Boulenger, 1920)
 Philautus davidlabangi Matsui, 2009
 Philautus disgregus Inger, 1989
 Philautus dubius (Boulenger, 1882)
 Philautus erythrophthalmus Stuebing and Wong, 2000
 Philautus everetti (Boulenger, 1894)
 Philautus garo (Boulenger, 1919)
 Philautus gunungensis Malkmus and Riede, 1996
 Philautus hosii (Boulenger, 1895)
 Philautus ingeri Dring, 1987
 Philautus jacobsoni (Van Kampen, 1912)
 Philautus juliandringi Dehling, 2010
 Philautus kakipanjang Dehling and Dehling, 2013
 Philautus kempiae (Boulenger, 1919)
 Philautus kempii (Annandale, 1912)
 Philautus kerangae Dring, 1987
 Philautus leitensis (Boulenger, 1897)
 Philautus longicrus (Boulenger, 1894)
 Philautus macroscelis (Boulenger, 1896)
 Philautus maosonensis Bourret, 1937
 Philautus microdiscus (Annandale, 1912)
 Philautus mjobergi Smith, 1925
 Philautus namdaphaensis Sarkar and Sanyal, 1985
 Philautus nephophilus Dehling, Matsui, and Yambun Imbun, 2016
 Philautus nianeae Stuart, Phimmachak, Seateun, and Sheridan, 2013
 Philautus pallidipes (Barbour, 1908)
 Philautus petersi (Boulenger, 1900)
 Philautus poecilius Brown and Alcala, 1994
 Philautus polymorphus Wostl, Riyanto, Hamidy, Kurniawan, Smith, and Harvey, 2017
 Philautus refugii Inger and Stuebing, 1996
 Philautus saueri Malkmus and Riede, 1996
 Philautus schmackeri (Boettger, 1892)
 Philautus surdus (Peters, 1863)
 Philautus surrufus Brown and Alcala, 1994
 Philautus tectus Dring, 1987
 Philautus thamyridion Wostl, Riyanto, Hamidy, Kurniawan, Smith, and Harvey, 2017
 Philautus tytthus Smith, 1940
 Philautus umbra Dring, 1987
 Philautus ventrimaculatus Wostl, Riyanto, Hamidy, Kurniawan, Smith, and Harvey, 2017
 Philautus vermiculatus (Boulenger, 1900)
 Philautus worcesteri (Stejneger, 1905)

Notes

References
 Gururaja, KV and Dinesh, KP and Palot, MJ and Radhakrishnan, C and Ramachandra, TV (2007) A new species of Philautus Gistel (Amphibia: Anura: Rhacophoridae) from southern Western Ghats, India. Zootaxa 1621:pp. 1–16. PDF
 Manamendra-Arachchi, K.& R. Pethiyagoda. 2005 The Sri Lankan shrub-frogs of the genus Philautus Gistel, 1848 (Ranidae: Rhacophorinae), with description of 27 new species. The Raffles Bulletin of Zoology, Supplement No. 12:163-303 PDF
 Meegaskumbura, M. & K. Manamendra-Arachchi. 2005. Description of eight new species of shrub-frogs (Ranidae: Rhacophorinae: Philautus) from Sri Lanka. The Raffles Bulletin of Zoology, Supplement No. 12:305-338. PDF

 
Rhacophoridae
Amphibians of Asia
Taxa named by Johannes von Nepomuk Franz Xaver Gistel
Amphibian genera